The Alberga River, also known as the Alberga Creek, is an ephemeral river that is part of the Lake Eyre basin located in the Far North region of the Australian state of South Australia.

Course and features

The river descends  over its  course.

The river is crossed by The Ghan near its source.

History

European history
The Alberga River was discovered on 23 March 1860 by John McDouall Stuart who considered it to be a branch of the Neales River. The river was named by William Christie Gosse in 1873. It is also known as Alberga Creek.

It was a junction between the central and southern sections on the Australian Overland Telegraph Line between the coasts of Australia. The southern section, between Port Augusta and Alberga Creek, was contracted to Edward Meade Bagot in 1870. The overland telegraph was completed on 22 May 1872.

See also

References 

Rivers of South Australia
Far North (South Australia)
Lake Eyre basin